Vir Singh/Veer Singh may refer to:

 Vir Singh (gymnast) (born 1930), Indian Olympic gymnast
 Vir Singh (writer) (1872–1957), poet and theologian
 Veer Singh Dillon (1792–1842), Sikh warrior
 Veer Singh (politician), (born 1956), Indian politician from Bahujan Samaj Party, Member of Parliament - Rajya Sabha - Uttar Pradesh
 Veer Pratap Singh (born 1992), Indian cricketer
 Vir Bahadur Singh (died 1990), Indian politician